The 1893 municipal election was held January 3, 1893 to elect the town council (consisting of a mayor and six aldermen, each elected for a one-year term) and three trustees for each of the public and separate school divisions.

Voter turnout

Voter turnout was 128 out of 268 eligible voters, or 47.7%.

Results

(bold indicates elected, italics indicate incumbent)

Mayor

Aldermen

References

City of Edmonton: Edmonton Elections

1893
1893 elections in Canada
1893 in Alberta